A hajduk (plural of ) is a type of irregular infantry found in Central and parts of Southeast Europe from the late 16th to mid 19th centuries.  They have reputations ranging from bandits to freedom fighters depending on time, place, and their enemies.

In the European lands of the Ottoman Empire, the term hajduk was used to describe bandits and brigands of the Balkans, while in Central Europe for the West Slavs, Hungarians, and Germans, it was used to refer to outlaws who protected Christians against provocative actions by the Ottomans.

By the 17th century they were firmly established in the Ottoman Balkans, owing to increased taxes, Christian victories against the Ottomans, and a general decline in security. Hajduk bands predominantly numbered one hundred men each, with a firm hierarchy under one leader. They targeted Ottoman representatives and rich people, mainly rich Turks, for plunder or punishment to oppressive Ottomans, or revenge or a combination of all.

In Balkan folkloric tradition, the hajduk (hajduci or haiduci in the plural) is a romanticised hero figure who steals from, and leads his fighters into battle against, the Ottoman authorities. They are comparable to the English legendary Robin Hood and his merry men, who stole from the rich (who as in the case of the haiduci happened to also be foreign occupiers) and gave to the poor, while defying seemingly unjust laws and authority.

People that helped hajduks were called jataks. Jataks lived in villages and towns and provided food and shelter for hajduks. In return, hajduks would give them part of the loot.

The haiduci of the 17th, 18th and 19th centuries commonly were as much guerrilla fighters against the Ottoman rule as they were bandits and highwaymen who preyed not only on Ottomans and their local representatives, but also on local merchants and travellers. As such, the term could also refer to any robber and carry a negative connotation.

Etymology
The etymology of the word hajduk is unclear.  One theory is that hajduk was derived from the Turkish word haidut or haydut 'bandit', which was originally used by the Ottomans to refer to Hungarian and Polish–Lithuanian Commonwealth infantry soldiers. Another theory suggests that the word comes from Hungarian hajtó  or hajdó (plural hajtók or hajdók) '(cattle) drover'. These two theories do not necessarily contradict each other because the Balkan word is said to be derived from the Turkish word haiduk or hayduk 'bandit'.

Other spellings in English include ajduk, haydut, haiduk, haiduc, hayduck, and hayduk.

Forms of the word in various languages, in singular form, include:

hajdut, in Albanian; in the ordinary sense of "thief"
hayduk (հայդուկ), in Armenian; used as a male given name, and it means "Armenian freedom fighter".
haydut (хайдут), haydutin (хайдутин) or hayduk (хайдук), in Bulgarian
haidouk, haiduque, in French
aiducco, in Italian
hajdú, in Hungarian
ajduk (ајдук), ajdutin (ајдутин), in Macedonian
hajduk, in Polish
Hajduk, in Romani
haiduc, in Romanian
hajduk (хајдук), in Serbo-Croatian
hajdúch in Slovak
hejduk, in Swedish
haydut, in Turkish; in the ordinary sense of "bandit"
hejduk, in Kurdish
gajduk (гайдук), in Russian
haidamaka (гайдамака), in Ukrainian
haydamak (הײַדאַמאַק), in Yiddish

Irregular military

Kingdom of Hungary

In 1604-1606, István Bocskay, Lord of Bihar, led an insurrection against the Habsburg Emperor, whose army had recently occupied Transylvania and begun a reign of terror. The bulk of Bocskay's army was composed of serfs who had either fled from the war and the Habsburg drive toward Catholic conversion, or been discharged from the Imperial Army. These peasants, freelance soldiers, were known as the hajduks. As a reward for their service, Bocskay emancipated the hajduk from the jurisdiction of their lords, granted them land, and guaranteed them rights to own property and to personal freedom. The emancipated hajduk constituted a new "warrior estate" within Hungarian feudal society. Many of the settlements created at this time still bear the prefix Hajdú such as Hajdúbagos, Hajdúböszörmény, Hajdúdorog, Hajdúhadház, Hajdúnánás, Hajdúsámson, Hajdúszoboszló, Hajdúszovát, Hajdúvid etc., and the whole area is called Hajdúság (Land of the Hajduk) (see Hajdú County)

Polish–Lithuanian Commonwealth

The word hajduk was initially a colloquial term for a style of footsoldier, Hungarian or Turco-Balkan in inspiration, that formed the backbone of the Polish infantry arm from the 1570s until about the 1630s. Unusually for this period, Polish-Lithuanian hajduks wore uniforms, typically of grey-blue woolen cloth, with red collar and cuffs. Their principal weapon was a small calibre matchlock firearm, known as an arquebus. For close combat they also carried a heavy variety of sabre, capable of hacking off the heads of enemy pikes and polearms. Contrary to popular opinion, the small axe they often wore tucked in their belt (not to be confused with the huge half-moon shaped berdysz axe, which was seldom carried by hajduks) was not a combat weapon, but rather was intended for cutting wood.

In the mid-17th century hajduk-style infantry largely fell out of fashion in Poland-Lithuania, and were replaced by musket-armed infantry of Western style. However, commanders or hetmans of the Polish–Lithuanian Commonwealth continued to maintain their own liveried bodyguards of hajduks, well into the 18th century as something of a throwback to the past, even though they were now rarely used as field troops. In imitation of these bodyguards, in the 18th century wealthy members of the szlachta hired liveried domestic servants whom they called hajduks, thereby creating the meaning of the term 'hajduk' as it is generally understood in modern Polish.

Serbian Militia (1718–39)

The Serbs established a Hajduk army that supported the Austrians. The army was divided into 18 companies, in four groups. In this period, the most notable obor-kapetans were Vuk Isaković from Crna Bara, Mlatišuma from Kragujevac and Kosta Dimitrijević from Paraćin.

Cultural influence
The Croatian football team HNK Hajduk Split; Serbian football teams Hajduk Kula, FK Hajduk Beograd, FK Hajduk Veljko and Hajduk Lion; the Macedonian football team FK Hajduk - Vratnica; the pop-music project Haiducii, and Romanian Roma musical troupe Taraful Haiducilor are all named after the hajduci. The surnames of the fictional character George Washington Hayduke, invented by Edward Abbey, actress Stacy Haiduk, US national soccer team defender Frankie Hejduk, Czech Republic national ice hockey team forward Milan Hejduk and Montenegrin theoretical physicist Dragan Hajduković, are likewise derived from this word.

The term "haiduci" was used by the Romanian resistance movement Haiducii Muscelului, between 1947 and 1959, which opposed the Soviet occupation and the Communist government.

Notable hajduks

Armenian

Arabo (1863–1893)
Aghbiur Serob (1864–1899)
Andranik (1865–1927)
Kevork Chavush (1870–1907)

Albanian
Çerçiz Topulli (1889–1915), important figure during the Albanian National Awakening and Albanian national hero

Bulgarian

 Delyo (late 17th and early 18th centuries)
 Chavdar Voyvoda (16th century)
 Indzhe Voyvoda (c. 1755 - 1821)
 Ilyo Voyvoda (1805 (?) - 1898)
 Angel Voyvoda (1812- c. 1864)
 Captain Petko Voyvoda (1844-1900)
 Panayot Hitov (1830-1918)
 Filip Totyu (1830-1907)
 Hadzhi Dimitar (1840-1868)
 Stefan Karadzha (1840-1868)
 Rumena Voyvoda (1829 - 1862 or 1895)

Region of Macedonia / Bulgaria 
Karposh (active also in Thrace and Moesia)

Romanian
Iancu Jianu (1787–1842), hajduk in Oltenia, participant of the Wallachian Uprising 
Radu Șapcă (Popa Șapcă,  1848–64), priest and hajduk in Oltenia, participant in the 1848 Revolutions in Wallachia
Pintea the Brave (Pintea Viteazul, d. 1703), rebel in the area of Maramureș.
Șaptecai (Anghel Panait)
Andrii Popa (1790-1818)

Greek

Odysseas Androutsos (1788-1825)
Markos Botsaris (1788-1823)
Athanasios Diakos (1788-1821)
Geórgios Karaïskákis (1782-1827)
Antonis Katsantonis (c. 1775-1808)
Theodoros Kolokotronis (1770-1843)
Dimitrios Makris (c. 1772 - 1841)
Nikitas Stamatelopoulos (c. 1784-1849)

Hungarian

Juraj Jánošík (1688-1713)
Angyal Bandi
Jóska Sobri (1810-1837)
Sándor Rózsa (1813-1878)

Ukrainian

Ustym Karmaliuk (1787-1835)
Ivan Gonta (1721-1768)
Maksym Zalizniak (1740-1768)

Czech, Polish and Slovak
Juraj Jánošík (1688-1713)
Ondráš
Matěj Ondra z Leskovce

Serbo-Croatian
 

Starina Novak (1530s–1601), Wallachian-employed guerrilla commander, former peasant in Timok
Deli-Marko (fl. 1596–1619), hajduk and military commander in Habsburg service
Ivo Senjanin (d. 1612), Habsburg Croatian uskok
Mijat Tomić (1610–1656), brigand leader in Ottoman Bosnia
Petar Mrkonjić (fl. 1645–69), Venetian-employed Croatian guerrilla
Bajo Pivljanin (fl. 1669–85), Venetian-employed guerrilla leader
Ilija Perajica (fl. 1685), Venetian-employed guerrilla leader
Ivan Bušić Roša (1745–1783), Venetian-employed Croatian guerrilla leader
Stanislav Sočivica (1715–1776), brigand leader in Ottoman Bosnia
Andrijica Šimić (1833–1905), Croatian rebel in Herzegovina
Pecija (1826–1875), rebel leader in Bosnian Krajina
Stanoje Glavaš (1763-1815), commander in the First Serbian Uprising
Stojan Čupić (c. 1765 - 1815), commander in the First Serbian Uprising
Hajduk Veljko (c. 1780-1813), commander in the First Serbian Uprising
Jovo Stanisavljević Čaruga (1897–1925), outlaw in Slavonia
Ivan Musić (1848–1888), duke of Herzegovina, leader of the uprising against the Ottomans.

References

Further reading

External links 

 Metaweb entry on "Haiduks"

Bandits
 
Hungarian words and phrases
Irregular units and formations
Irregular military
Outlaws
Ottoman period in the Balkans
Transylvania in the Kingdom of Hungary
Turkish words and phrases